The following is a list of destinations served by SAS Commuter as it became integrated into Scandinavian Airlines Denmark, Scandinavian Airlines Sweden and SAS Braathens. Routes in Norway were served by Westlink, in Sweden by Swelink and the rest by Eurolink. Eurolink also served some destinations in Norway and Sweden.

Austria
Vienna (Vienna International Airport)
Belgium
Brussels (Brussels Airport)
Czech Republic
Prague (Ruzyně International Airport)
Denmark
Aalborg (Aalborg Airport)
Aarhus (Aarhus Airport)
Billund (Billund Airport)
Copenhagen (Copenhagen Airport)
Estonia
Tallinn (Lennart Meri Tallinn Airport)
Finland
Helsinki (Helsinki-Vantaa Airport)
Germany
Berlin (Tegel International Airport)
Düsseldorf (Düsseldorf Airport)
Hamburg (Hamburg Airport)
Hanover (Hanover/Langenhagen International Airport)
Stuttgart (Stuttgart Airport)
Lithuania
Vilnius (Vilnius International Airport)
Norway
Bergen (Bergen Airport, Flesland)
Haugesund (Haugesund Airport, Karmøy)
Kristiansand (Kristiansand Airport, Kjevik)
Kristiansund (Kristiansund Airport, Kvernberget)
Oslo (Oslo Airport, Gardermoen)
Stavanger (Stavanger Airport, Sola)
Trondheim (Trondheim Airport, Værnes)
Netherlands
Amsterdam (Amsterdam Schiphol Airport)
Poland
Gdańsk (Gdańsk Lech Wałęsa Airport)
Poznań (Poznań-Ławica Airport)
Warsaw (Warsaw Frederic Chopin Airport)
Russia
Saint Petersburg (Pulkovo Airport)
Sweden
Gothenburg (Göteborg Landvetter Airport)
Helsingborg (Ängelholm-Helsingborg Airport)
Kalmar (Kalmar Airport)
Karlstad (Karlstad Airport)
Luleå (Luleå Airport)
Malmö (Malmö Airport)
Örnsköldsvik (Örnsköldsvik Airport)
Ronneby (Ronneby Airport)
Stockholm
(Stockholm-Arlanda Airport)
(Stockholm-Skavsta Airport)
Sundsvall-Härnösand (Sundsvall-Härnösand Airport)
Umeå (Umeå Airport)
Switzerland
Zürich (Zurich International Airport)
Geneva (Geneva Cointrin International Airport)

Scandinavian Airlines
Lists of airline destinations